Police Dog  is a 1955 British crime film directed by Derek Twist and starring Charles Victor, Nora Gordon, Cecil Brock, John Le Mesurier, James Gilbert, and Christopher Lee.

Plot
Constables Mason and Hill spot a burglar leaving the scene of the crime and both give chase, but Hill is badly shot by the burglar before Mason can catch up. Back at the police station Mason befriends Rex, a stray Alsatian dog recently brought in by another officer. Now living abroad, its owners agree to donate it to the police and it and Mason begin training together, causing tensions back home with Mason's girlfriend Pat Lewis, daughter of his landlady and her late policeman husband - Pat resents being unable to treat Rex as a pet and his drawing Mason's attention away from their relationship. Rex and Mason complete their training and go on patrol on the streets of Hampstead.

In the meantime Hill has died of his injuries and his killer continues to lie low, taking on temporary work at a builder's until the CID arrive and he has to flee. Mason and Pat's relationship becomes more and more strained and he decides to move himself and Rex out. Soon afterwards he and Rex are deployed to a factory where Hill's still-armed killer is breaking into a safe. They pursue him, with Rex holding onto the killer long enough to make an arrest. Meaning to meet Mason for a final discussion about their relationship, Pat arrives at the crime scene and instead reconciles with both Mason and Rex.

Cast
Joan Rice as Pat Lewis
Tim Turner as Frank Mason
Sandra Dorne as the Blonde
Charles Victor as Sergeant
Rex III as the Dog
Nora Gordon as Mrs Lewis
Cecil Brock as Crook
John Le Mesurier as C.I.D. inspector
James Gilbert as Police Constable Hill
Christopher Lee as Police Constable Johnny
Ian Fleming as Man on the Heath

Production
The film was made at National Studios in Borehamwood England, and on location. A collection of then-and-now location stills and corresponding contemporary photographs is hosted at reelstreets.com.

Critical reception
TV Guide noted an "average police drama, produced under the auspices of Douglas Fairbanks, Jr.'s, production company."
Radio Times called the film a "competent quota quickie...It's hardly a baffling mystery even Scooby-Doo would have sussed it! However, it's always nice to see class acts like John Le Mesurier and Christopher Lee, no matter how briefly."

References

External links

British crime films
1955 films
Films directed by Derek Twist
1955 crime films
Police dogs in fiction
Films shot at British National Studios
1950s English-language films
1950s British films
British black-and-white films